Tetropium is a genus of long-horned beetles in the family Cerambycidae. There are at least 20 described species in Tetropium.

Species
These 27 species belong to the genus Tetropium:

 Tetropium abietis Fall, 1912 i c g b (roundheaded fir borer)
 Tetropium aquilonium Plavilstshikov, 1940 c g
 Tetropium auripilis Bates, 1885 i c g
 Tetropium beckeri Franz, 1955 c g
 Tetropium castaneum (Linnaeus, 1758) i c g
 Tetropium cinnamopterum Kirby in Richardson, 1837 i c g
 Tetropium confragosum Holzschuh, 1981 c g
 Tetropium danilevskyi Sláma, 2005 c g
 Tetropium fuscum (Fabricius, 1787) c g b (brown spruce longhorn beetle)
 Tetropium gabrieli Weise, 1905 c g
 Tetropium gracilicorne Reitter, 1889 c g
 Tetropium gracilicum Hayashi, 1983 c g
 Tetropium guatemalanum Bates, 1892 c g
 Tetropium laticolle Podaný, 1967 c g
 Tetropium morishimaorum Kusama & Takakuwa, 1984 c g
 Tetropium opacipenne Bates, 1885 c g
 Tetropium opacum Franz, 1955 c g
 Tetropium oreinum Gahan, 1906 c g
 Tetropium parallelum Casey, 1891 c g
 Tetropium parvulum Casey, 1891 i c g b (northern spruce borer)
 Tetropium pilosicorne Linsley, 1935 c g
 Tetropium scabriculum Holzschuh, 1993 c g
 Tetropium schwarzianum Casey, 1891 i c g b
 Tetropium schwerdtfegeri Franz, 1955 c g
 Tetropium staudingeri Pic, 1901 c g
 Tetropium tauricum Shapovalov, 2007 c g
 Tetropium velutinum LeConte, 1869 i c g b (western larch borer)

Data sources: i = ITIS, c = Catalogue of Life, g = GBIF, b = Bugguide.net

References

Further reading

External links

 

Spondylidinae
Articles created by Qbugbot
Cerambycidae genera